Jarosław Bogdan Pacoń (8 January 1972 – 13 November 2021) was a Polish footballer who played as a defender.

Club career
Pacoń started his career with Stal Gorzyce in 1990. In the 1993–94 Ekstraklasa season, he played 10 games for Stal Stalowa Wola. He also played for KSZO Ostrowiec Świętokrzyski and Korona Kielce where he was widely regarded as one of the best second division defenders. He ended his career at the American Olympia Stamford SC.

Retirement and death
After retirement he stayed in the USA and ran a construction company. He died on 13 November 2021 in Stamford at the age of 49. He was buried on 23 November 2021 at the Spring Grove Cemetery, with a prior Mass for the deceased at the Holy Name of Jesus Church.

References

External links

1972 births
2021 deaths
People from Braniewo
Polish footballers
Association football defenders
Stal Gorzyce players
Stal Stalowa Wola players
KSZO Ostrowiec Świętokrzyski players
Korona Kielce players
Ekstraklasa players
I liga players
Polish expatriate footballers
Polish expatriate sportspeople in the United States